Neoauthoritarianism, also known as Chinese Neoconservativism or New Conservatism since the 1990s, is a current of political thought within the People's Republic of China (PRC), and to some extent the Chinese Communist Party (CCP), that advocates a powerful state to facilitate market reforms. It may be described as classically conservative even if elaborated in self-proclaimed "Marxist" theorization.

Initially gaining many supporters in China's intellectual world, the failure to develop democracy led to intense debate between democratic advocates and those of Neoauthoritarianism in the late 1980s before the 1989 Tiananmen Square protests and massacre. Neoauthoritarianism remains relevant to contemporary Chinese politics, and is discussed by both exiled intellectuals and students as an alternative to the immediate implementation of liberal democracy, similar to the strengthened leadership of Soviet general secretary Mikhail Gorbachev.

Based on reworked ideas of Samuel Huntington, Huntington had advised the post-Communist East European elite take a gradualist approach to market economics and multiparty reform, hence "new authoritarianism". A rejection of the prevalent more optimistic modernization theories, but nonetheless offering faster reform than the socialist market economy, policy makers close to Premier Zhao Ziyang would be taken by the idea. The doctrine may be typified as being close to him ideologically if not organizationally as well. In early March 1989, Zhao presented Wu's idea of neoauthoritarianism as a foreign idea in the development of a backward country to Deng Xiaoping, who compared it to his own ideology.

Background
Post-Mao China stressed a "pragmatic approach to rebuilding the country's economy", employing "various strategies of economic growth" following the 1978 Third Plenum that made Deng Xiaoping the top leader of China, beginning the Chinese economic reform. By 1982 the success of China's market experiments had become apparent, making more radical strategies seem possible, if not desirable. This led to the lifting of price controls and agricultural decollectivization, signaling the abandonment of the New Economic Policy, or economic Leninism, in favour of a market economy.

Alongside economic development, political changes were made as well, departing from totalitarianism towards what Harry Harding characterizes as a "consultative authoritarian regime." One desire of political reform was to "restore normalcy and unity to elite politics so as to bring to an end the chronic instability of the late Maoist period and create a more orderly process of leadership succession." With cadre reform, individual leaders in China, recruited for their performance and education, became more liberal, with less ideological loyalty.

History

Emergence 
Having begun in the era of Mao Zedong's Cultural Revolution, decentralization accelerated under Deng Xiaoping. Writing in 1994, in an apparently neoauthoritarian/neoconservative vein, Zheng Yongnian considers of the era that "Deng's early reform decentralized power to the level of local government (with the goal) to decentralize power to individual enterprises... But this attempt... ran afoul of the growing power of local government, which did not want individual enterprises to retain profit (and) began bargaining with the central government over profit retention, (seizing) decision-making power in the enterprises. This intervention inhibited the more efficient behavior that reforms sought to elicit from industry; decentralization... limited progress."

Though the government took a clear stance against liberalization in December 1986, political discussions centered in Beijing would nonetheless emerge in academic circles in 1988 in the form of democracy and Neoauthoritarianism. Neoauthoritarianismisn would catch the attention of the Chinese Communist Party (CCP) in early 1988 when Wu Jiaxiang wrote an article in which he concluded that the British monarchy initiated modernization by "pulling down 100 castles overnight", thus developmentally linking autocracy and freedom as preceding democracy and freedom.

Persistence as Neoconservativism 
Neoauthoritarianism lost favor after the 1989 Tiananmen Square protests and massacre. Henry He considers that, while June 4 halted the movement for democracy, because neoauthoritarianism avoids the issue of popular involvement, it would therefore be a downfall for it and General Secretary Zhao Ziyang as well. He considers it to have transformed into a kind of "neo-conservatism" after that. New Conservatism or neoconservatism argued for political and economic centralization and the establishment of shared moral values. The movement has been described in the West by political scientist Joseph Fewsmith. Neoconservatives are opposed to radical reform projects and argue that an authoritarian and incrementalist approach is necessary to stabilize the process of modernization.

With the failure of democracy in Russia and the performance of Singapore, neo-conservatism would seem to continue to infiltrate the upper echelons of the CCP. Most associated with Shanghai intellectuals, Wang Huning, a leading advocate in the 1980s, would go on to become a close advisor to CCP general secretary Jiang Zemin in the 1990s. The neo-conservatives would enjoy Jiang's patronage.

Joseph Fewsmith writes that, the 1989 crackdown aside, the government lacked the resources to fundamentally address the problems of the worsening agricultural sector, shifting the past conservative-reform dynamic to one of guiding marketization and managing the consequences of reform. Writing in 1994, Zheng Yongnian considered capitalism as providing a check on state power by dividing public and private spheres, and that "Neoconservativism" was becoming popular at that time, in contrast to liberal intellectuals who argued for the collapse of the centralized state as necessary to economic growth. He writes that "In order to introduce a true market economy, Beijing has to free individual enterprises from local administrative meddling and regain control over funds for central investments in the infrastructure. The state must first recentralize in order to deepen decentralization, as many authors suggest."

Still considering democracy a long-term goal, the events of June 4 seemed to confirm the "neoconservatives" belief in a strong state, considering China's autocratic model to actually be weak and ineffectual. They also consider a strong state important in economic growth along the lines of Asian Tiger economies and continued to draw ideas from Samuel Huntington, particularly his book Political Order in Changing Societies. Whatever his use as a foreigner who advocated limiting the scope of democracy, his ideas seemed to have merit on their own.

Social critic Liu Xiaobo believed that the CCP grew conservative in response to 1989, without any new ideas, and apart from "neo-conservativism" conservatism itself became popular in intellectual circles along with the revival of old Maoist leftism.

An important neoconservative document was the 1992 China Youth Daily editorial "Realistic Responses and Strategic Options for China after the Soviet Upheaval", which responded to the fall of the Soviet Union. "Realistic Responses" described the end of the Soviet state as the result of "capitalist utopianism", and argued that the CCP should transform from a "revolutionary party" into a "ruling party". The authors believed that the party should depart from the legacy of the Bolshevik Revolution and reformulate socialism according to China's particular national conditions.

The neoconservatives enjoyed the patronage of Jiang Zemin during his term as top leader and General Secretary of the Chinese Communist Party (1989–2002), and Jiang's theory of the Three Represents has been described as a "bowdlerized form of neoconservatism". Prominent neoconservative theorists include Xiao Gongqin, initially a leading neoauthoritarian who promoted "gradual reform under strong rule" after 1989, and Wang Huning, who became a member of the Politburo Standing Committee, the CCP's highest executive body, headed by CCP general secretary Xi Jinping in 2017.

Theory 
A central figure, if not principal proponent of Neoauthoritarianism, the "well-connected" Wu Jiaxiang was an advisor to Premier Zhao Ziyang, the latter being a major architect of the Deng Xiaoping reforms. Essentially, Wu restated some ideas presented by Marxist scholar Rong Jian, and through him Samuel Huntington.

Samuel Huntington's Political Order in Changing Societies rejected economic development or modernization as transferable to the political sphere as a mere variable of the former. He preconditioned democracy on institutionalization and stability, with democracy and economic change undermining or putting strain on political stability in poor circumstances. He considered the measure of a political system to be its ability to keep order. Writing in the 1960s, he lauded the United States and Soviet Union equally; what the Soviet Union lacked in social justice was made up for in strong controls.

By the late 1980s, many elements of Maoism had been abandoned in China and a complete transition to capitalism seemed possible to many given past performance. Though needing restating by Wu Jiaxiang to receive attention, Marxist scholar Rong Jian proposed a neoauthoritarianism requiring a strong state and reform-minded elite, or "benevolent dictatorship", to facilitate market reform and with it democracy.

Chinese theory does not generally advocate repression. Despite its dictatorial program, neoauthoritarianism seems viewed even by its more-progressive opponents among the Chinese as having democracy as a long-term goal through building markets, with which democracy is ultimately co-dependent (and may have been rejected as too radical partly for this reason).

With a more Marxistic foundation, Neoauthoritarianism is differentiated from both Maoism and Huntington by holding economic change to be a condition for political change, while late Maoism considered either as being able to facilitate the other. Moreover, the idea that superstructural development was necessary to facilitate economic growth seemed dubious to Chinese leadership given the explosion of the market, giving credence to the idea.

For his part, Wu considered the market an inseparable condition for democracy. The market reduces the number of public decisions and therefore the number of people seeking political rights and therefore "cost" of political action. The separation of the political and economic spheres lays a foundation for a further separation of powers, thereby negating autocracy despite the centralizing tendency of the state. The market also defines interests, increasing "responsibility" and thereby decreasing the possibility of bribery in preparation for democratic politics. On the other hand, political actions become excessive without a market, or with a mixed market, because a large number of people will seek political posts, raising the "cost" of political action and making effective consultation difficult. To avoid this problem, a country without a developed market has to maintain strongman politics and a high degree of centralism.

Socialistic resurgence 
Despite comparison to his own views, Deng Xiaoping's approach would appear to have been more moderated in approach than Neoauthoritarianism would suggest, favoring continued state control over the economy.

Although China's Leninist, or New Economic Policy (NEP) type model had been abandoned by 1982, there was not initially any attempt at privatization. Despite the dictates of the neoauthoritarian current that rapid industrialization lead to privatization in the countryside and the encouraging of commerce, decollectivization was very slow. The agricultural system remained largely unchanged following the program for family farming that had been begun in the 1970s, which was finished by late 1983.

The death of Deng Xiaoping would seem to have removed the last barrier to Jiang Zemin's neoauthoritarian program. However, though the market performed very well, and China's state could be considered "strong" enough for neoauthoritarianism, privatization, even while maintaining a mixed economy, would require a massive program that might threaten the regime with unemployment, and given the problems in Eastern Europe, the party seems to have taken a more realistic route than neoauthoritarianism suggested. Despite Jiang Zemin's rapprochement with Dengist reformism, reception of free trade remained shallow, with a higher level of state ownership than any of the other East Asian economies.

With price liberalization appearing much more feasible, the party took on a massive program in 1996. Howevever, the ideological vision followed for the 1990s continued to be market socialism, of a sort advocated by the conservative Chen Yun and which might be compared to John Roemer, with price liberalization being completed in 2003. Moreover, price liberalization can be considered as "merely continuing a policy begun in the 1980s." "Market socialism" was seen as doing away with the informational problems of the planned economy while possibly avoiding the inequalities of share ownership.

Growth aside, the economic expansion and price liberalization of the 1980s led to inflation, contributing to the growth of the democratic movement preceding the 1989 Tiananmen Square protests and massacre, while the old Leninist or NEP model continued to attract Old Left intellectuals. The 1990s also saw the emergence of the New Left of Wang Shaoguang and Cui Zhiyuan against market economics, with Wang providing powerful arguments against decentralization and inequality and Cui for workplace democracy based on Mao's Angang Constitution. On the other hand, the nationalistic He Xin portrayed the attempts by the World Bank to impose neoliberalism as cultural imperialism if not suicide, gaining him many allies. More generally, Chinese leadership saw parliamentarism, independent judiciary and a free media as key components to (more real) private property if China was to develop a market, decreasing its appeal.

Legacy 
China's measures for successful economic and political stabilization led many scholars and politicians to accept the role of an authoritarian regime in fast and stable economic growth. Although the Chinese state is seen as legitimizing democracy as a modernization goal, economic growth is seen as more important.

In his 1994 article Zheng Yongnian elaborates that, "Administrative power should be strengthened in order to provide favorable conditions, especially stable politics, for market development. Without such a political instrument, both 'reform' and 'open door' are impossible...  A precondition of political development is the provision of very favorable conditions for economic progress. Political stability must be given highest priority... without stable politics, domestic construction is impossible, let alone an 'open door' policy. So, if political reform or democracy undermines political stability, it is not worthwhile. In other words, an authoritarian regime is desirable if it can produce stable politics."

Deng Xiaoping explains: "Why have we treated student demonstrations so seriously and so quickly? Because China is not able to bear more disturbance and more disorder." Given the dominance of the Chinese state, Zheng believes that, when it is finally implemented, democracy in China is more likely to be a gift from the elite to the society rather than brought about by internal forces.

A 2018 study of schools of political theory in contemporary China identified neoconservatism, still alternatively named neoauthoritarianism, as a continuing current of thought alongside what are now the academically more prominent Chinese New Left, New Confucianism, and Chinese liberalism.

Criticism and views 
When neoauthoritarianism emerged to scholarly debate, Rong Jian opposed his old idea as regressive, favoring the multiparty faction. He would become famous for a news article on the matter.

Chinese-Canadian sociologist Yuezhi Zhao views the neoauthoritarians as having attempted to avoid an economic reform crisis through dictatorship, and Barry Sautman characterizes them as reflecting the policy of "pre-revolutionary Chinese leaders" as well as "contemporary Third World strongmen", as part of ideological developments of the decade he considers more recognizable to westerners as conservative and liberal. Sautsmans sums its theory with a quote from Su Shaozi (1986): "What China needs today is a strong liberal leader."

Li Cheng and Lynn T. White nonetheless regard the neoauthoritarians as resonating with technocracy emerging in the 1980s as a result of "dramatic" policy shifts in 1978 that promoted such to top posts. Henry He considers the main criticism of neoauthoritarianism to be its continued advocacy of an "old" type of establishment, relying on charismatic leaders. His view is corroborated by Yan Yining and Li Wei, with the addition that for Yan what is needed is law, or Li democracy, administrative efficiency and scientific government. Li points out that previous crisis in China were not due to popular participation, but power struggles and corruption, and that an authoritarian state does not usually separate powers. A criticism by Zhou Wenzhang is that neoauthoritarianism only considers problems of authority from the angle of centralization, similarly considering the main problem of authority to be whether or not it is exercised scientifically.

See also 

Politics of China
Dang Guo
Authoritarianism
Benevolent dictatorship
Conservatism
Neoconservatism
Technocracy
Traditionalist conservatism

References 

Conservatism in China
Politics of China
Authoritarianism
Contemporary Chinese philosophy